Jorge "Piqui" Cazulo (born 14 February 1982) is an Uruguayan footballer who plays for Torneo Descentralizado club Sporting Cristal. He can play as a central or attacking midfielder.

Club career
Cazulo started his career  Uruguayan club Plaza Colonia in 2004. He has also played for Defensor Sporting and Nacional in Uruguay.

Honours

Club
Defensor Sporting
Uruguayan Primera División: 2007–08

Nacional
Uruguayan Primera División: 2008–09

Sporting Cristal
Torneo Descentralizado: 2012
Torneo Descentralizado: 2014
Torneo Descentralizado: 2016
Torneo Descentralizado: 2018
Liga 1: 2020

References

1982 births
Living people
Footballers from Montevideo
Uruguayan footballers
Uruguayan expatriate footballers
Uruguayan Primera División players
Peruvian Primera División players
Peñarol players
Defensor Sporting players
Club Nacional de Football players
Racing Club de Montevideo players
Club Deportivo Universidad César Vallejo footballers
Sporting Cristal footballers
Expatriate footballers in Peru
Association football midfielders